Matthew-Aaron Dusk (born November 19, 1978) is a Canadian jazz vocalist. He has four certified gold albums: Two Shots, Good News, Old School Yule! and JetSetJazz, and two certified platinum albums; My Funny Valentine: The Chet Baker Songbook and Just the Two of Us (with Margaret).

Life and career
Dusk was born on November 19, 1978 in Toronto, Ontario, Canada. From an early age, he wanted to become a performer. At the age of seven, he was accepted into St. Michael's Choir School, where he remained for eleven years. He performed opera and classical music but after hearing Tony Bennett, Bob Fenton, and Sarah Vaughan when has seventeen he began to change his musical direction. In 1998, he won the Canadian National Exhibition Rising Star Competition. He intended to take over the family business, and in 1998 he went to York University in Toronto to study economics. After one year, he decided to switch to music. He studied jazz theory with John Gittins, jazz vocal with Bob Fenton, and attended master classes taught by Oscar Peterson. He was awarded the Oscar Peterson Scholarship and graduated in 2002.

Before Dusk secured a record deal, he recorded four albums independently. In March 2003, he signed a deal with Decca. In 2004 he was invited to the Golden Nugget Casino in Las Vegas to perform as in-house entertainer for the filming of the television show The Casino.

His debut album, Two Shots, was released on June 5, 2004 and was certified gold in Canada. The album produced the hit single "Two Shots of Happy, One Shot of Sad", which was written by Bono and The Edge of the rock band U2. This song was the theme for The Casino. Dusk followed up his debut album with a holiday EP entitled Peace on Earth which was released on November 30, 2005.

In January 2006, Dusk traveled to Los Angeles to record his second album, Back in Town at Capitol Studio A. He recorded with a 58 piece orchestra conducted by Patrick Williams and Sammy Nestico and recorded by Al Schmitt. Back in Town includes a mix of jazz standards and originals and was released in June 2006.

Good News was released on October 27, 2009 in Poland and Canada. The album paid tribute to the crooner style but was produced in a contemporary style. In late 2009, Good News was certified gold in Poland.

In March 2010, Dusk recorded the soundtrack to the TV series Call Me Fitz. On August 25, 2010, Dusk recorded a live DVD concert special for PBS which aired in America in December 2010 and across the world in 2011. The concert was recorded live at the Rio All Suite Hotel and Casino in Las Vegas with a 17 piece big band.

In 2013 Dusk returned to his jazz roots and released his My Funny Valentine: The Chet Baker Songbook. It included an eighty piece orchestra and guests such as Arturo Sandoval, Guido Basso, Emilie-Claire Barlow, and Ryan Ahlwardt of the American a cappella band Straight No Chaser . The album paid homage to Chet Baker. On October 10, 2013, the album was certified gold in Poland. On December 17, 2013, the album achieved platinum status (also in Poland). In 2013 Dusk recorded a duet with Edyta Górniak. Additionally in 2013, Dusk performed songs for the Daniel Tiger's Neighborhood special "Snowflake Day," including a version of the show's opening tune, based on the theme for Mister Rogers' Neighborhood and the songs "The Snowflake Day Song," "Let Your Light Twinkle" and "It's Such a Good Feeling."

In 2014 Dusk began work on his 8th studio album which was a duet album.  Produced by Dusk, it featured a jazz sextet and string orchestra.  Musically the album pays homage to the bossa nova genre, with songs by Antonio Carlos Jobim.  The album was recorded and released in 2015 and 2016 three times with different duet partners.  In Canada, the album is called Quiet Nights with French-Canadian singer Florence K and was number one on the Canadian Jazz charts for 16 weeks. It was nominated for an ADSIQ.  In Poland, the album is called Just the Two of Us with  Polish singer Margaret, was certified platinum and won a Roze Gali award.  In Japan, the album is called "Lost in Rio" with Japanese singer Karen Aoki.

In 2016 Dusk self-produced his first full length Christmas album, Old School Yule!. The album included over 100 musicians and the St. Michael's Choir School, his childhood school. The album received GOLD status (ZPAV POL).

In 2018 Dusk released his twelfth studio album entitled JetSetJazz which received MC: GOLD status in April 2019.  The album co written, recorded and produced by Dusk pays homage to the golden age of travel throughout the 1960s taking the listener on a journey back in time when big band crooning music was popular.

In 2020 Dusk released Sinatra Vol 1.  The album received PLATINUM status (ZPAV POL) 

In 2021 Dusk released Sinatra Vol 2. The album received GOLD status (ZPAV POL)

Discography

Albums

See also 
List of jazz musicians
List of Canadian musicians

References

Sources 
[ All Music Biography] - last accessed on July 16, 2011

External links

1978 births
Living people
Musicians from Toronto
Canadian jazz singers
21st-century Canadian male singers
Canadian male jazz musicians